Diego Domínguez (born 13 October 1991), is a Spanish actor, singer and cage-fighter. He is known for playing the character of Diego in the Disney Channel telenovela Violetta.

Personal life 
Diego was born in Zaragoza, Spain. His height is 177 cm and his weight is 62 kg. He has 3 tattoos. He dated his Violetta co-star Clara Alonso (who played Angie) from late 2012 to early 2018.

Filmography

Theater 
 Nosotros, el musical (2014)

Discography

Studio albums 
 2004: Girando sin parar
 2005: Mueve el esqueleto
 2006: Un sitio ideal

Live albums 
 2004: 3+2 en concierto
 2013: Violetta en Vivo

Soundtracks 
 2005: Trollz: melenas a la moda
 2013: Hoy somos más
 2014: Gira mi canción
 2015: "Crecimos Juntos"

References

External links 
 

1991 births
Living people
Spanish male telenovela actors
21st-century Spanish singers
21st-century Spanish male singers